In politics, hardline or hard-line is an adjective describing a stance on an issue that is inflexible and not subject to compromise. A hardliner is a person holding such views.  The stance is usually far from the centrist view. People, policies, and laws can be considered hardline. A hardliner may be either a reactionary or a revolutionary. Synonyms for hardliner include diehard, hawk, extremist, fanatic, or zealot. The term is almost always relative to the Overton window of a given time and place.

Examples by country

France 
The French government has taken a hardline stance against terrorism. France removed restrictions on raiding houses of suspected terrorists, although only five cases have been brought to court while over four thousand searches were conducted. Critics say the approach unfairly blames the Muslim community for radical extremists.

Iran 
Ebrahim Raisi, a Shi'ite cleric and prominent politician, ran as a hardline challenger to President Rouhani in 2017 and was Rouhani's main challenger. He ran primarily on economic reforms and increasing distance with the West.
He later ran again for President in 2021 and won the election by 61.9% of the popular vote, succeeding Rouhani, who was term-limited.

Russia 
After increased sanctions by Western countries, a poll from 2016 recorded that fifty-nine percent of Russians did not want their government to change its behavior. The respondents felt that either Westerns wanted to harm Russia, hold it to standards they did not live up to, or were simply ignorant of Russian reasoning for actions.

United Kingdom 
Brexit is a hardline position on relations with the European Union. The United Kingdom voted to leave the European Union to preserve its sovereignty, which was dubbed Brexit. After the vote, the two top searches on Google about the European Union were the implications of leaving the European Union and what "EU" (short for European Union) meant.

United States 
One of the more common issues that uses hardline or hardliner as a description is illegal immigration. For example, the United States House of Representatives had two bills in June 2018 about immigration to consider: the hardline and centrist options. The House failed to pass the centrist bill. The House did not vote on the more extreme bill.

Words implying hardline stances

Hawk 
A hawk is someone who prefers an extreme or aggressive stance, typically on war. When referring to war, a hawk is always in favor of war. The opposite is a dove, who prefers peace. However, the term hawk can also be used for other issues, like the deficit. John McCain, the American senator and 2008 presidential nominee was a [war] hawk because of his policies on the Middle East. A current example of a hawk is John R. Bolton, who was the national security advisor for President Trump.

See also 
 Amity-enmity complex
 Fundamentalism
 Groupthink
 Ideocracy
 Ideology
 Reactionary
 Siege mentality
 State collapse
 The Anatomy of Revolution
 The True Believer

References 

Political ideologies
Political theories
Political spectrum
Political terminology